Dworszowice Pakoszowe  is a village in the administrative district of Gmina Sulmierzyce, within Pajęczno County, Łódź Voivodeship, in central Poland.

The village has a population of 800.

References

Dworszowice Pakoszowe